Malus yunnanensis is a species in the genus Malus, family Rosaceae, with the common name Yunnan crabapple. In Mandarin Chinese, it is called “滇池海棠” (Diānchí hǎitáng).

The tree bears single white flowers with a light pink tint, fruit color is red with white dots, moderate texture and roundish form.

References

yunnanensis
Crabapples
Endemic flora of China
Flora of Yunnan